'The Virginian' is a 1914 American silent Western film based on the 1902 novel The Virginian by Owen Wister. The film was adapted from the successful 1903–04 theatre play The Virginian, on which Wister had collaborated with playwright Kirke La Shelle. The Virginian starred Dustin Farnum in the title role, a role he reprised from the original play. It was directed by Cecil B. DeMille.

Cast
 Dustin Farnum as The Virginian
 Horace B. Carpenter as Spanish Ed (uncredited)
 Sydney Deane as Uncle Hughey (uncredited)
 Cecilia de Mille as Little Girl (uncredited)
 Tex Driscoll as Shorty (uncredited)
 William Elmer as Trampas (uncredited)
 James Griswold as Stage Driver (uncredited)
 Jack W. Johnston as Steve (uncredited)
 Anita King as Mrs. Ogden (uncredited)
 Winifred Kingston as Molly Wood (uncredited)
 Dick La Reno as Balaam (uncredited)
 Mrs Lewis McCord as Mrs. Balaam (uncredited)
 Monroe Salisbury as Mr. Ogden (uncredited)
 Russell Simpson as (uncredited)
 Hosea Steelman as Lin McLean (uncredited)

References

External links

 Owen Wister Papers at the University of Wyoming – American Heritage Center
 
 The Virginian (1914) at SilentEra
 
 The manuscript of Owen Wister's book The Virginian is preserved at the American Heritage Center at the University of Wyoming.
 

1914 films
1914 Western (genre) films
American black-and-white films
Articles containing video clips
Films based on American novels
Films based on Western (genre) novels
Films directed by Cecil B. DeMille
Films set in Wyoming
Paramount Pictures films
Silent American Western (genre) films
1910s American films
1910s English-language films